The Dogwalker is a 2001 film directed and produced by Jacques Thelemaque, starring Diane Gaidry (Ellie Moore) and Pamela Gordon (Betsy Wright).

The film closely observes the rocky relationship that develops between a destitute young woman (Diane Gaidry), who has fled her abusive boyfriend, and a reclusive, misanthropic professional dog walker (Pamela Gordon).

Cast
 Diane Gaidry (Ellie Moore)
 Pamela Gordon (Betsy Wright)
 Lyn Vaus (Walter)
 Lisa Jane Persky (Alison)
 Alan Gelfant (Glen)
 John Nielson (Dave)
 Kerry Bishop (Amanda Singer)

Production crew
 Director: Jacques Thelemaque
 Producers: Linda L. Miller, Hilary Six, Jacques Thelemaque
 Co-producers: Tori-Ann Parker, Diane Gaidry, Andrew M. Somers
 Executive Producers: David Diann, Thoms Gaidry
 Associate Producers: Willard Morgan, Michael Blaha
 Creative Collaborators: Sean Hood, Diane Gaidry
 Director of Photography: Marco Fargnoli
 Additional Photography: Toby Birney
 Editor: Jeff Orgill
 Production Coordinator: Destri Martino

Awards
 Cinequest Film Festival '02 Best First Feature
 Ashland Independent Film Festival '04 Best Cinematography
 Hong Kong International Film Festival Official Selection
 Los Angeles Film Festival  Official Selection

References

External links
 
 Bigfoot Ascedant
 The Dogwalker Film

2000s English-language films
American independent films
2000s American films